Mine to Keep is a 1923 American silent drama film directed by Ben F. Wilson and starring Bryant Washburn, Charlotte Stevens and Wheeler Oakman.

Synopsis
A newly married couple both suspect the other of infidelity. They separate and she goes to nurse the injured dancer she believes her husband had an affair with. Ultimately all turns out well and the couple reconcile.

Cast
 Bryant Washburn as 	Victor Olney
 Mabel Forrest as Constance Rives
 Wheeler Oakman as 	Clint Mowbray
 Charlotte Stevens as 	Carmen Joy
 Laura La Varnie as Mrs. Joy
 Peaches Jackson as 	Joy child
 Michael D. Moore as 	Joy child 
 Pat Moore as 	Joy child
 Francis Ford as Jack Deering
 Harry Dunkinson as 	Sewell
 Charles Mason as 	Pelton
 Edith Stayart as 	Mrs. Deering

References

Bibliography
 Connelly, Robert B. The Silents: Silent Feature Films, 1910-36, Volume 40, Issue 2. December Press, 1998.
 Munden, Kenneth White. The American Film Institute Catalog of Motion Pictures Produced in the United States, Part 1. University of California Press, 1997.

External links
 

1923 films
1923 drama films
1920s English-language films
American silent feature films
Silent American drama films
American black-and-white films
Films directed by Ben F. Wilson
1920s American films